The Paris Feminist and Lesbian Film Festival (French: Festival International du Film Lesbien et Féministe de Paris) is a women-only film festival founded in Paris, France, in 1989. The festival is organized by Cineffable, an association dedicated to promoting lesbian cinema, and encouraging lesbian creativity.

History 
The Paris Feminist and Lesbian Film Festival grew out of dissatisfaction with the treatment of Lesbians in the Créteil International Women's Film Festival. Many lesbian women felt that in spite of the fact that lesbian films frequently won the Viewers Choice awards (prix du public), lesbian films, filmmakers and attendees were not given sufficient space or attention at the festival, and so they decided to create their own event, which would not only provide lesbians with screening opportunities, but would also be a shared community for knowledge sharing, a way to increase lesbian visibility and combat lesbophobia, and a social outlet.

The first event was held in 1989, as a "cinéclub", with subsequent festivals in 1992 and 1993, all held at the La Clef Cultural Center in Paris. As the festival grew, it moved venues, first to the André Malraux Cultural Center (Le Kremlin-Bicêtre) until 2000, when the number of attendees grew to between 2000 and 3000, and then to the Le Trianon theater. Since 2010, the festival screens at l'Espace Reuilly.

Organization 
The festival is organized and produced by the Cineffable association. The association includes several thousand members, making it one of the more significant lesbian organizations in France. It is run according to feminist principles – it is non-hierarchical, based on knowledge sharing and transfer for continuity, and defines its mission statement as "we have to assume responsibility, to take control of our images, to become actresses in our own productions in order to break definitively with the oppressive system of representation that shuts us in, that shuts us up".

The festival is open to anyone who identifies as a woman, and is based on membership attendance; that is – attendance is free for members, and thus anyone desiring to attend the festival purchases a membership card, which provides access or discounts to other Cineffable events as well. The festival is self-funded, except for an annual grant from the city of Paris, as part of an official program for gender equality, and works on the principle of "no one left outside" through discounts for marginalized communities and a ticket sharing program, enabling access for all to screenings.

The festival includes several competition tracks, debates, an art exhibition, workshops and a gala or concert event. Audience awards are granted at the festival in the following categories:
 Feature film
 Feature-length documentary
 Short fiction film
 Short documentary
 Experimental film
 Animation

In previous years, there were also awards for best screenplay and best film poster.

The festival has grown steadily since its inception. It screens over 50 films each year.

Best Feature Film awards

See also 
 List of women's film festivals

References

External links 
 
 

Lesbian culture in Europe
Lesbian events
Lesbian feminism
Film festivals established in 1989
1989 establishments in France
LGBT film festivals in France
Women's film festivals
Film festivals in Paris
Feminism in France
LGBT culture in Paris
Women in Paris